Ricardo Omar Giusti (born 11 December 1956) is an Argentine former footballer. A midfielder, he played most of his career with Argentine side Independiente. At international level, he won the FIFA World Cup with Argentina in 1986 and was also a runner-up in the 1990 edition of the tournament. With 53 caps Giusti is currently 38th in the appearance records for the Argentina national football team. He played a part in five major tournaments for his nation.

Club career
During his career, Giusti played for Unión de Santa Fe, Argentinos Juniors and Newell's Old Boys, but he had most of his success with Independiente where he captained the team in their most successful era, and was part of the sides that won the Primera Division Argentina titles in the 1983 Metropolitano Championship and during the 1988–89 season. He was named as the club's best midfielder during Independiente's 90th anniversary.

International career
At international level, Giusti played a part in five major tournaments for Argentina. He won the FIFA World Cup with Argentina in 1986, where he played in every game for the eventual champions. He also played in the 1990 FIFA World Cup where, after missing the first two group matches, he went on to figure in every game up till the semi-finals where Argentina knocked out the hosts Italy. Giusti was sent off in that match after a second bookable offence where he elbowed Italian forward Roberto Baggio. Argentina were defeated 1–0 by West Germany in the final of the competition.

Giusti is currently 22nd in the appearance records for Argentina with a total of 53 caps between 1983 and 1990.

Career statistics

International

Honours

Club
Independiente
Argentine Primera División: Metropolitano 1983, 1988–89
Copa Libertadores: 1984
Intercontinental Cup: 1984

International
Argentina
FIFA World Cup: 1986

References

External links

 
 10th in South America Player of the Year 1987

1956 births
Living people
People from Rosario Department
Argentine people of Italian descent
Association football midfielders
Argentine footballers
Newell's Old Boys footballers
Argentinos Juniors footballers
Club Atlético Independiente footballers
Unión de Santa Fe footballers
Argentina international footballers
Copa Libertadores-winning players
FIFA World Cup-winning players
1986 FIFA World Cup players
1990 FIFA World Cup players
1983 Copa América players
1987 Copa América players
1989 Copa América players
Argentine Primera División players
Sportspeople from Santa Fe Province